Woodlands Community College is a mixed secondary school located in east Southampton, Hampshire, in the south of England. It was officially opened as a specialist school for science and engineering by MP David Miliband on 26 January 2005.

The last Ofsted inspection was in 2019, when the school was judged as Requiring Improvement. but most recent inspection lead to the rating of Good.

References

External links
 The school's website
 The school on Ofsted's website

Secondary schools in Southampton
Foundation schools in Southampton

Specialist engineering colleges in England
Specialist science colleges in England